Tamil Malaysians, also known as Malaysian Tamilar, are people of full or partial Tamil descent who were born in or immigrated to Malaysia from Tamil Nadu, India and the Tamil regions of north-east Sri Lanka. The majority of 1.8–2 million people 80% of the Malaysian Indian populations in Malaysia were from Indian Tamil ethnic groups from Tamil Nadu and Sri Lanka. The bulk of Tamil Malaysian migration began during the British Raj, when Britain facilitated the migration of Indian workers to work in plantations. There are, however, some established Tamil communities from before British colonialism.

Precolonial period

Relations between Tamils and, what is now, Malaysia have existed for more than 2000 years. The ancient Tamil poetic work Paṭṭiṉappālai refers to the territory of modern Malaysia as Kaalagam (Tamil: காழகம்).

Tamil literature from the 10th and 11th centuries refers to the modern Malaysian state of Kedah as Kadaram (Tamil: கடாரம்)

Prior to British colonization, Tamils had been conspicuous in the archipelago much earlier, especially since the period of the powerful South Indian kingdom of the Cholas in the 11th century. The Pallava dynasty of Tamil Nadu spread Tamil culture and the Tamil script to Malaysia. The Tamil emperor Rajendra Chola I of the Chola dynasty invaded Srivijaya in the 11th century.

The Malay Peninsula had a strong Tamil culture in the 11th century, and Tamil merchant guilds were established in several locations. By that time, Tamils were among the important trading peoples of maritime Asia. Although the bulk of these immigrants to South East Asia had assimilated with the majority Malay ethnic group, some communities such as the Malacca Chittys are remnants of these earlier Tamil migrants.

Colonial period

During the British colonial era, Britain facilitated the migration of Indian workers to work in plantations. The overwhelming majority of migrants from India were ethnic Tamil and from the Madras Presidency now Tamil Nadu of the British Empire.

Those migrants from Tamil Nadu after some years they were permanently settled there itself and now they are owns jobs by shopkeepers and entrepreneurs.

Tamil Indian freedom fighters Maruthu Pandiyar relatives and 72 soldiers were deported to Penang in the year 1802 by the Madras Presidency Government (British India Government).

Siam Burma Death Railway

During the Second World War, the Japanese army used more than 120,000 Tamils in the construction of a 415km railway between Siam and Burma to transport army supplies. During this project, it was initially believed that half of them (around 60,000) perished.

However, recent research revealed that at least 150,000 Indian Tamils were killed during the duration of the Siam railway project. They fell victim to snake bites and insect bites, diseases like cholera, malaria & beriberi, massacre, torture, rape, committed suicide, etc. as they were unable to bear the burden.

In order to wipe out cholera, Japanese forces launched huge massacres against the Indians, killing massive numbers of the Tamils daily. Handfuls of Tamils also died weekly from overwork. Some Japanese soldiers also died during these times.

Other methods of executing the Indian Tamils included burning them and their entire families to death. Japanese officers would also invite female Indian coolies to dance naked where they were raped afterward. The Japanese officials who finished gang raping numerous Indian women at a Japanese party was violent that one Indian woman was raped to death as a result. One 19 year old Tamil Indian was raped by a Japanese soldier who later forced other Tamil coolies to rape her as a joke. She later died after being defiled by bamboo strips.

Language
Tamil is an educational language in Malaysia, with more than 500 Tamil medium schools. According to Harold Schiffman, an American researcher into Malaysian Tamils, compared to Singapore, language maintenance is favourable in Malaysia. However, he notes some Tamils are shifting to English and Malay. Although most Tamil students still go to publicly funded schools that teach primary subjects in Tamil language there are moves to shift to the Malay language. Tamil groups have objected to this policy.

Economic condition

Malaysian Tamils had the opportunity to integrate with the expanding economy of Malaysia since 1970 under the New Economic Policy (NEP). Although the bulk of them still remain as workers in the plantation sector in rubber and palm oil estates at those times very many have moved out as blue collar and white collar workers in the expanding industrial sector. They are also found in civil service, professional sector, media and finance. One of Malaysia's wealthiest men Ananda Krishnan is of Malaysian Tamil origin. Overall it is one of the most dynamic Indian communities compared to other Indian diaspora groups such as in Fiji, Guyana and Trinidad and Tobago.

Political condition

The Malaysian political process is based on a cooperative political alliance of three major political parties, each representing an ethnic community. Malaysian Indian Congress (MIC) represents the interests of the Malaysian Indian community at the federal level. Due to overwhelming natural presence, Malaysian Tamils have come to dominate the MIC since its inception. Samy Vellu, who is the longest serving leader of a mainstream Malaysian political party, having been MIC president since October 12, 1979 is a Malaysian Tamil, as are many of the office bearers of the party.
In recent times the underclass of the Indian community have been galvanised by the Hindu Rights Action Force (HINDRAF) to fight for their rights. HINDRAF was classified as an illegal organisation on 15 October 2008 and most of its top leaders have been detained under the Internal Security Act (ISA). In July 2018 Malaysian police launched a probe into P. Ramasamy's, deputy chief minister of Penang, alleged ties to LTTE.

Notable people

This is a list of notable Tamil Malaysians. Entries on this list have a linked current article which verifies that they identify themselves as Tamil Malaysian, and whose ethnic origins lie in either Tamil Nadu, India, or Sri Lanka.

See also

Tamil South Africans
Tamil Canadians
List of Malaysian Tamils of Ceylonese origin
 Malaysian Malayali

References

External links
Markers of ethnic identity: focus on the Malaysian Tamil community

Tamil people
Dravidian peoples

 
Ethnic groups in Malaysia
 
Malaysia
Immigration to Malaysia
Malaysia